Robert Brown (c. 1824 – 13 December 1906) was a New Zealand bootmaker and botanist. He was born in Glasgow, Scotland, probably between 1821 and 1824.

References

19th-century New Zealand botanists
Scottish botanists
1824 births
1906 deaths
Scottish emigrants to New Zealand
Shoemakers